The Barrie Film Festival is an annual film festival in Barrie, Ontario, Canada. It is held at the Barrie Uptown Theater. Since it began in 1997, the festival has expanded to include galas, a short-film competition, a director's brunch, educational workshops and guest Q&As. It is associated with The Film Circuit, a division of the Toronto International Film Festival.

The festival briefly moved to the Bayfield cinema in 2009 when the downtown cinema closed and changed hands

See also
 List of festivals in Canada

References

Film festivals in Ontario
Non-profit organizations based in Barrie
Film festivals established in 1997
Culture of Barrie